Parr Brook is a watercourse in Greater Manchester and a tributary of the River Roch. It originates in Unsworth and flows through Bury Golf Club before joining the River Roch at Blackford Bridge.

Rivers of the Metropolitan Borough of Bury
Rivers of Greater Manchester
1